"(Sing Shi-Wo-Wo) Stop the Pollution" is a 1991 song by Sweden-based musician and producer Dr Alban, released as the fourth and last single from his debut album, Hello Afrika (1990). It was a moderate hit in Europe, peaking at number two in Greece and number three in Finland. Additionally, it was a top 20 hit in both Switzerland and Austria. Denniz Pop co-wrote and produced it. A music video was also produced to promote the single.

Track listing
 12" single, Sweden (1991)
"(Sing Shi-Wo-Wo) Stop the Pollution" (Long Version) – 6:39
"(Sing Shi-Wo-Wo) Stop the Pollution" (Dub Version) – 3:06
"(Sing Shi-Wo-Wo) Stop the Pollution" (Radio Version) – 3:59
"Wo-Wo-Music" (Wo-Wo Version) – 4:17                   

 CD maxi, Scandinavia (1991)
"(Sing Shi-Wo-Wo) Stop the Pollution" (Radio Version) – 4:02
"(Sing Shi-Wo-Wo) Stop the Pollution" (12" Original Mix) – 6:42
"(Sing Shi-Wo-Wo) Stop the Pollution" (Dub Version) – 3:09
"Wo-Wo Music" (Radio Version) – 4:20                   
"Groove Machine 2" (The Long Version) – 6:30

Charts

References

 

1991 singles
1991 songs
Dr. Alban songs
English-language Swedish songs
Logic Records singles
Song recordings produced by Denniz Pop
Songs written by Denniz Pop
Songs written by Dr. Alban